Feminine Wiles (Spanish: Cosas de mujer) is a 1951 Argentine film directed by Carlos Schlieper. It stars Zully Moreno and Ángel Magaña. It is based on a play by Louis Verneuil.

Cast
Zully Moreno
Ángel Magaña
Esteban Serrador
Nélida Romero
Severo Fernández
Fina Basser
Carlos Enríquez
Héctor Méndez
Aurelia Ferrer
Pancho Flores

References

External links
 

1951 films
1950s Spanish-language films
Argentine black-and-white films
Films based on works by Louis Verneuil
Films directed by Carlos Schlieper
Argentine comedy films
1951 comedy films
1950s Argentine films